Loliolum is a genus of Asian and North African plants in the grass family. The only known species is Loliolum subulatum, native to Turkey, Caucasus, the Middle East, Iran, Pakistan, Afghanistan, Central Asia, and Morocco.

References

Pooideae
Monotypic Poaceae genera